Pauwels Sauzen–Bingoal (UCI Code: PSB) is a UCI continental cycling team that is based in Belgium and races predominantly the cyclo-cross season. The team is named after its main sponsors Pauwels Sauzen, a condiment brand, and Bingoal, a Belgian sports betting website.

Team roster

Major victories

Men

Cyclo-cross

2008–2009
Superprestige Gieten, Klaas Vantornout
2011–2012
Overall UCI Cyclo-cross World Cup, Kevin Pauwels
Tábor, Kevin Pauwels
Igorre, Kevin Pauwels
Heusden-Zolder, Kevin Pauwels
Hoogerheide, Kevin Pauwels
Overall Gazet van Antwerpen Trophy, Kevin Pauwels
+ 3 round victories, Kevin Pauwels
Cyclo-cross Gavere, Kevin Pauwels
UCI Cyclo-cross season ranking, Kevin Pauwels
2012–2013
Tábor, Kevin Pauwels
Namur, Kevin Pauwels
Rome, Kevin Pauwels
Superprestige Gieten, Klaas Vantornout
Middelkerke, Klaas Vantornout
 Belgian National Cyclo-cross Championships, Klaas Vantornout
2013–2014
Cyclo-cross Ruddervoorde, Klaas Vantornout
2014–2015
Superprestige Gavere, Klaas Vantornout
Superprestige Zonhoven, Kevin Pauwels
Superprestige Spa-Francorchamps, Kevin Pauwels
UCI Cyclo-cross World Cup Milton Keynes, Kevin Pauwels
 U23 World Cyclo-cross Championships, Michael Vanthourenhout

2021-22
Rapencross, Eli Iserbyt
Beringen, Eli Iserbyt
Cyclocross Bredene, Eli Iserbyt
Berencross, Michael Vanthourenhout
Grand Prix Dohňany, Witse Meeussen
UCI Cyclo-cross World Cup Waterloo, Eli Iserbyt
UCI Cyclo-cross World Cup Iowa City, Eli Iserbyt
Kermiscross, Laurens Sweeck
UCI Cyclo-cross World Cup Overijse, Eli Iserbyt
X²O Badkamers Trophy Koppenbergcross, Eli Iserbyt
Cyclo-cross Superprestige Jaarmarktcross , Eli Iserbyt
GP Leuven, Laurens Sweeck
Cyclo-cross Superprestige Merksplas, Eli Iserbyt
UCI Cyclo-cross World Cup Koksijde, Eli Iserbyt
UCI Cyclo-cross World Cup Besançon, Eli Iserbyt
UCI Cyclo-cross World Cup Namur, Michael Vanthourenhout

2022-23
Poldercross, Michael Vanthourenhout
Beringen, Eli Iserbyt
Berencross, Michael Vanthourenhout
UCI Cyclo-cross World Cup Waterloo, Eli Iserbyt
UCI Cyclo-cross World Cup Fayetteville, Eli Iserbyt
UCI Cyclo-cross World Cup Tábor, Eli Iserbyt
Cyclo-cross Superprestige Ruddervoorde, Eli Iserbyt

Road cycling

2010
Stage 1 Tour of Małopolska, Martin Zlámalík
2011
Stage 3 Kreiz Breizh Elites, Kevin Pauwels
Stage 1 Tour of Małopolska, Tijmen Eising
Stages 1 & 3 Carpathia Couriers Tour, Tijmen Eising

Women

Cyclo-cross
2021-22
Rapencross, Denise Betsema
Cyclocross Bredene, Denise Betsema
Cyclo-cross Superprestige Ruddervoorde, Denise Betsema
UCI Cyclo-cross World Cup Zonhoven, Denise Betsema
UCI Cyclo-cross World Cup Val di Sole, Denise Betsema

2022-23
Poldercross, Fem van Empel
Beringen, Fem van Empel
UCI Cyclo-cross World Cup Waterloo, Fem van Empel
UCI Cyclo-cross World Cup Fayetteville, Fem van Empel
UCI Cyclo-cross World Cup Tábor, Fem van Empel
Cyclo-cross Superprestige Ruddervoorde, Denise Betsema
UCI Cyclo-cross World Cup Maasmechelen, Fem van Empel
Koppenbergcross, Fem van Empel

References

External links

UCI Continental Teams (Europe)
Cycling teams based in Belgium
Cycling teams established in 2007